Santo Rosario may refer to:
Santo Rosario, Bohol, a village in the Philippines
Santo Rosario de Pasig Church, a church in Pasig, Philippines
Santo Rosario, Comacchio, a church in Comacchio, Ferrara,  Emilia-Romagna, Italy

See also
Rosario (disambiguation)